Eugénie Sokolnicka (née Kutner; 14 June 1884, Warsaw – 19 May 1934, Paris) was a French psychoanalyst. An analysand of Freud's, she helped bring psychoanalysis to France in the 1920s, analysing several of the younger psychiatrists at St. Anne's Psychiatric Hospital in Paris.

She ended her own life, by gas poisoning.

Works
 L'analyse d'un cas de névrose obsessionnelle infantile, 1920

See also
 René Laforgue
 Édouard Pichon

Notes

References
 Michelle Moreau-Ricaud: Engénie Sokolnicka et Marie Bonaparte in Topique n0 115, ed.: L'esprit du Temps, 
 André Gide, Les faux monnayeurs, Gallimard, 1925

1884 births
1934 suicides
French psychoanalysts
Polish emigrants to France
Analysands of Sándor Ferenczi
Analysands of Sigmund Freud
Suicides by gas
Suicides in France